Foreign Trade of the DPRK is a North Korean magazine. It covers North Korean companies that are looking to export their products and introduces their contact details. The magazine is affiliated with the North Korean Committee for the Promotion of International Trade. It is published quarterly by the Foreign Trade Publishing House of North Korea. The magazine is published in English, Chinese, French, Japanese, Russian and Spanish.

Companies and products
A 2011 South Korean analysis of the magazine's issues from a period of five years concluded that there are about 200 North Korean export companies in operation attempting to earn foreign currency. In reality, however, the number could be smaller since North Korean companies regularly change names in order to avoid sanctions.

Some companies offer to produce goods according to buyers' specifications. The magazine is known for promoting sometimes unusual products. For instance, in 2013, the magazine advertised unauthorized Sesame Street Big Bird, Cookie Monster and Elmo plush animals manufactured by the Kyonghung Trading Corporation. A 2015 issue promoted furs by the Taehung Fur Trading Corporation, despite there being no previous knowledge of North Korea's fur exports. The same issue also promoted a "cure-all" pill with vague descriptions of dosage and uncertain adherence to medicinal standards, likely aimed at the oriental medicine market in Asia.

See also

 Economy of North Korea#External trade
 Foreign Trade Bank of the Democratic People's Republic of Korea
 Korea Today
 Media of North Korea
 Ministry of External Economic Relations

References

External links
  at Publications of the DPRK
 List of 200 North Korean companies featured in Foreign Trade (XLS) at North Korean Economy Watch
 List of North Korean companies sourced from Foreign Trade (PDF) at Public Intelligence

Business magazines
Magazines with year of establishment missing
Mass media in Pyongyang
Multilingual magazines
Magazines published in North Korea
Quarterly magazines
Communist magazines
Economy of North Korea
State media